AR-231,453 is an agonist for the suggested novel cannabinoid receptor GPR119.

See also 
 PSN-375,963
 PSN-632,408

References 

Drugs not assigned an ATC code
Cannabinoids
Benzosulfones
Nitropyrimidines
Piperidines
Oxadiazoles
Aromatic amines
Fluoroarenes
Anilines
Isopropyl compounds